Tup Aghaj (also Romanized as Tūp Āghāj and Towp Āghāj; also known as Tūp Āqāj) is a village in Almalu Rural District, Nazarkahrizi District, Hashtrud County, East Azerbaijan Province, Iran. At the 2006 census, its population was 302, in 61 families.

References 

Towns and villages in Hashtrud County